Plasma-Lyte is a crystalloid solution for intravenous infusion, with varying electrolyte formulation depending on market. Generally the solution has a composition that mimics human physiological plasma electrolyte concentrations, osmolality and pH.

It is available as a generic medication.



Plasma-lyte 148 (pH7.4) 

Plasma-Lyte 148 is a market-specific solution available in the United Kingdom and Australia, among others and has the following composition:

Sodium 140 mmol/L
Potassium 5 mmol/L
Magnesium 1.5 mmol/L
Chloride 98 mmol/L
Acetate 27 mmol/L
Gluconate 23 mmol/L

This solution is manufactured and marketed by Baxter International Inc.

References

Blood substitutes
Intravenous fluids